The Aviatik D.III was a  German prototype single-seater fighter plane from the First World War, designed by Aviatik. It became the basis for the Aviatik D.IV and Aviatik D.V. In November 1917, the plane was first flown, using a 195 hp Benz Bz IIIbo gearless engine. It was of similar design to the Aviatik D.II, and was armed with two LMG 08/15 machine guns. After several tests at Adlershof from February 9–12, 1918, the plane underwent modifications, as requested by the Idflieg. In April, a second prototype, powered by a Benz Bz IIIbm, although several D.III powered by the original IIIbo engine were already under production; however, none of them were ever completed.

Specifications

References

1910s German fighter aircraft
D.III
Aircraft first flown in 1917